László Helyey (21 May 1948 – 3 January 2014) was a Hungarian actor.

He was the permanent Hungarian dubbing voice of Gérard Depardieu and Donald Sutherland. He also dubbed Morgan Freeman in several films.

Filmography

References

External links

1948 births
2014 deaths
Hungarian male stage actors
Male actors from Budapest
Hungarian male voice actors